Kerani (1968) is a Dutch composer, orchestrator, and producer of Hungarian descent. Her music has been described as sophisticated, and carefully crafted, with classical influences. 
Kerani scores music for documentaries, short film and trailers. At this moment, she has 9 albums to her name.  She is a three-time winner of the prestigious ZMR Music Award for Best Neo-Classical New Age Album.

Biography 

Born in Belgium to Hungarian parents, Kerani lives in the Netherlands where she runs Kerani Music Studio, a music recording and media production company near Maastricht.

At the age of 18, Kerani teamed up with a couple of studio musicians to record her instrumental compositions Seagullsong and Oblivion. The single got national airplay and Oblivion became the tune of a breakfast show on Radio 2 Flanders. In this period, she also performed as lead vocalist and keyboardist in a cover band.

Her professional musical career took flight in 2011 when Kerani composed the soundtrack to a number of documentary films commissioned by the Historical Society of the Roerstreek in the Netherlands. In that same year, she released her first album, Wings of Comfort. Her next album, The Journey, was launched exactly one year later. Both recordings received strong airplay. Meanwhile, she also worked for Peaceful Radio, a Dutch internet radio station, where she conducted interviews with various international new-age artists, such as Rodrigo Rodriguez and Sabine van Baaren.

In the run-up to the release of her third album Arctic Sunrise in 2014, Kerani wrote the soundtrack to several documentaries commissioned by the NWO - the Dutch Organization for Scientific Research. She also re-orchestrated a large set of children's songs for an instruction DVD for disabled children, called 't Steyntje zingt. 
Arctic Sunrise went to #2 on the International Zone Music Reporter Chart for new-age music, got airplay on hundreds of radio stations worldwide, was a Top 10 album on the annual ZMR rankings, and won the ZMR Neo-Classical Album of the Year Award. From this album, the classical track Far Away from Home was re-orchestrated, recorded and published for windband by Bronsheim Music.

In 2015, a few days before performing in concert with Terry Oldfield, Kerani launched her fourth concept and bestseller album, Equilibrium  On this album, she was joined by special guest musicians including concertmaster of the South-Netherlands Philharmonic Orchestra Wilfred Sassen, violist Joanne Wigmans, cellist Joep Willems and brass musician Jos Gijsen. Some of the musicians are known internationally, such as shakuhachi flute player and recording artist Rodrigo Rodriguez , guitarist Romain van Beek and flutist and vocalist Jan Mertens. The album received a nomination for the Best Neo-Classical New Age Album by the ZMR and was also nominated for Best Electronic Album by One World Music Radio in the UK.

In the spring of 2017, Kerani released her fifth concept album, called Stardust. Stardust  is a space-themed album that was recorded with Roermonds Orkest De Symphonie, conducted by Christiaan Janssen, Gemengd Vocaal Ensemble Canto Rinato, conducted by Anton Kropivšek. In total, 60 musicians participated in this elaborate project, which was led by executive producer Arno Op den Camp, and supported by multi-Grammy and Latin Grammy Award winning producer Kabir Sehgal, who also wrote the liner notes in the CD booklet. While receiving many accolades from the international press  and holding the #1 position in the ZMR International Top 100 Radio Airplay Chart during the months of June  and July 2017, Stardust got nominated in 2 categories by the ZMR: New Age Album of the Year 2017 and Best Neo-Classical Album.

In 2018, Kerani launched her sixth neoclassical album, called Small Treasures, a collection of musical inspirations which found their origin in experiences that have affected Kerani's life. This makes Small Treasures her most personal work to this day. Small Treasures was recorded with a string quartet, supplemented with a select number of guest artists, such as Grammy nominated Canadian flautist Ron Korb, Irish singer songwriter Chanele McGuinness and Brazilian soprano coloratura and guitarist Carla Maffioletti. Just like its predecessor, Small Treasures held the #1 position in the ZMR International Top 100 Radio Airplay Chart for 2 months. The album won the ZMR Music Award for Best Neo-Classical Album of 2018., At the same time, the song Garden of Dreams got nominated for the 2018 Peace Song Awards in the New Age category.

September 2020 - Almost two years after the release of Small Treasures, Kerani returned with an epic body of work called Sands of Time. Inspired by Greek mythology, the music on this album describes the most beautiful elements that brought forth life on earth, such as Love, Beauty, Light, and Wisdom. “The myths and legends of the ancient Greek may be archaic, but their human aspect is still valid. We should use our love and knowledge to create beauty and bring peace to the world.”, says Kerani. 
Sands of Time got voted Best Neo-Classical Album of 2020 by the jury of One World Music Radio  and by the broadcasters and radio hosts of the Zone Music Reporter.

February 2022 - Ripcue Music published Celtic Otherworld , a 31-track album written and orchestrated by Kerani and destined for the international TV & film market.

March 2022 marked the release of Kerani's 8th concept album called The Water of Life, an ode to the powerful element of water.

Kerani produces and hosts 2 radioshows for One World Music Radio. "Kaleidoscope"  is a theme-based show in which she brings a wide variety of new age music, ranging from piano solo to neo-classical. In "Musings"  she conducts interviews with musicians who have left their mark in the new age music industry, such as Moya Brennan, Erik Wøllo, Michael Hoppé, and Andreas Vollenweider.

Discography 

 Wings of Comfort (album 2011)
 The Journey (album 2012)
 Echo of our Souls (single 2013)
 Wonderful Peace/Stralande Jul (single 2013)
 Arctic Sunrise (album 2014)
 The Story of Christmas (single 2014)
 Equilibrium (album 2015)
 Days of Yore (single 2016)
 Stars (single 2016)
 The Little Shepherd's Flute (single 2016)
 Stardust (album 2017)
 Drive (single 2018)
 Small Treasures (album 2018)
 City Skylines (single 2019)
 A Christmas Wish (single 2019)
 One World (single 2020)
 Summer Romance - featured on New Beginnings -  OWMR charity album (2020)
 Sands of Time (album 2020)
 The Crystal Dancer (single 2021)
 Celtic Otherworld (album 2022) published by RipCue Music GmbH
 The Water of Life (album 2022)

References

External links 
 Official Website
 Kerani Music Studio
 Kerani's YouTube Channel
 Discogs
 Kerani Album Productions FB-page
 "Kaleidoscope" Kerani's music show on OWMRadio
 "Musings With..." Kerani's interview show on OWMRadio
 Kerani on Anchor
 Sittard Creatief interviews Kerani

 Steinse componiste wint Amerikaanse muziekprijs

Living people
Belgian composers
Belgian expatriates in the Netherlands
Year of birth missing (living people)